NGZ can refer to:

National Gallery of Zimbabwe, a gallery in Harare, Zimbabwe
Naval Air Station Alameda, a former United States Navy air station in California (FAA identifier: NGZ)
Neuß-Grevenbroicher Zeitung, a regional edition of the German newspaper Rheinische Post
North Gaza Governorate, a governate of the State of Palestine (ISO 3166-2: NGZ)
Central Teke language, a language spoken in the Republic of Congo and Democratic Republic of the Congo (ISO 639-3: ngz)

See also
Yaiba: Ninja Gaiden Z (abbreviated Yaiba: NGZ), a third-person hack and slash video game